Robert William Clifford (born May 2, 1937) is an American politician, lawyer and retired justice on the Maine Supreme Judicial Court. He was appointed to this position on August 1, 1986 by then-governor Joseph Brennan. He was reappointed to seven-year terms in 1993, 2000, and 2007. He retired in 2009.

Education
Clifford grew up in Lewiston, Maine and graduated from Lewiston High School in 1955. He graduated from Bowdoin College in 1959, and earned a J.D. degree from Boston College Law School in 1962. He then served in the United States Army from 1962 to 1964 with the U.S. Seventh Army in Germany, attaining the rank of captain. In 1998, he earned an LLM in Judicial Process from the University of Virginia School of Law.

Career
Upon leaving the armed forces, Clifford practiced law in Lewiston-Auburn for fifteen years with the firm Clifford & Clifford. He was also an alderman and a two-time mayor in this city.

During his legislative tenure, he represented the senate on the Commission to Revise Maine's Probate Laws, which drafted Maine's current Probate Code. In 1978 and 1979 he was the Chairman of the Lewiston Charter Commission, which drafted Lewiston's current city charter.

On June 8, 1979, former Governor Joseph Brennan appointed Clifford to the state's Superior Court. Another appointment by Chief Justice Vincent L. McKusick made Clifford the first chief justice of the Maine Superior Court in 1984, a position he would hold until his appointment to the Supreme Judicial Court on August 1, 1986 by Governor Brennan.

Justice Clifford served as the Court's liaison to the Advisory Committee on the Rules of Criminal Procedure, and to the Maine Assistance Program. He also served as an adviser to the Criminal Law Advisory Commission.

Prior to his judicial service, Clifford worked in the state's senate during the 106th and 107th Legislatures as a Democrat.

Personal life
His wife is Clementina whom he married in 1964 and they have two children.

References

Martindale-Hubbell Law Directory Profile
(95) Robert W. Clifford Associate Justice 1986-present (old webpage)

|-

|-

1937 births
Living people
20th-century American lawyers
20th-century American judges
20th-century American politicians
21st-century American judges
21st-century American lawyers
Boston College Law School alumni
Bowdoin College alumni
Justices of the Maine Supreme Judicial Court
Maine state court judges
Democratic Party Maine state senators
Military personnel from Maine
People from Lewiston, Maine
United States Army officers
University of Virginia School of Law alumni